Michael Robert Bohn (born November 16, 1960) is the athletic director at the University of Southern California. He was hired on November 11, 2019, following the resignation of Lynn Swann. He previously held the same position at the University of Cincinnati, University of Colorado, San Diego State University, and the University of Idaho. 

Born in Hinsdale, Illinois, Bohn's family moved to Boulder, Colorado, when he was a year old; he was a three-sport athlete at Boulder High School and graduated in 1979. At the University of Kansas in Lawrence, Bohn was a quarterback on the Jayhawks' football team in 1982, and was also on the baseball team in 1982 and 1983. He graduated with a Bachelor of Arts degree in 1983, and earned a master's degree in sports administration from Ohio University in 1984.

After more than five years as athletic director at Idaho, and eighteen months at San Diego State, Bohn was appointed at Colorado in 2005, succeeding Dick Tharp and Jack Lengyel (interim); his appointment was extended for a second five-year term in 2010. Hired at Cincinnati in 2014, he succeeded Whit Babcock, who left for Virginia Tech.

References

External links
 University of Southern California profile
 University of Cincinnati profile
 University of Colorado profile

Place of birth missing (living people)
1960 births
Living people
USC Trojans athletic directors
Cincinnati Bearcats athletic directors
Colorado Buffaloes athletic directors
Idaho Vandals athletic directors
San Diego State Aztecs athletic directors
Kansas Jayhawks football players
American football quarterbacks
Players of American football from Colorado
Kansas Jayhawks baseball players
Baseball first basemen
Baseball outfielders
Baseball pitchers
Baseball players from Colorado
Ohio University alumni
Sportspeople from Boulder, Colorado